Ruth Kasirye (born June 10, 1982 in Mukono, Uganda) is a Norwegian weightlifter competing in the Women's 58 kg and 63 kg categories.

She came to Norway in 1998.

In the 58 kg category, she competed at the 2005, 2006, and 2007 World Weightlifting Championships, ranking 12th, 14th, and 8th, lifting a total of 185 kg, 191 kg, and 209 kg.

At the 2007 European Championships she won silver in the 58 kg category, with a total of 210 kg.
At the 2008 European Championships she won the bronze medal in the snatch, and overall ranked fourth in the 63 kg category, with a total of 222 kg.

She represented Norway at the 2008 Summer Olympics, and was also the Norwegian flag bearer at the Opening Ceremony. In the Olympic tournament she ranked 7th in the 63 kg category, with a total of 224 kg.

References
 Athlete Biography at beijing2008

External links
 Results 

1982 births
Living people
Norwegian female weightlifters
Weightlifters at the 2008 Summer Olympics
Olympic weightlifters of Norway
Ugandan emigrants to Norway
Sportspeople from Tønsberg
European Weightlifting Championships medalists
21st-century Norwegian women